The 1975 Oregon State Beavers football team represented Oregon State University in the 1975 NCAA Division I football season.  were played on campus in Corvallis at Parker Stadium, with two at Civic Stadium in Portland.

Following an eighth straight loss to open the season, he announced his resignation in early November, effective at the end of the   only win came the following week,  over Washington State in a land-grant cellar matchup in Parker   finale Civil War against Oregon at Eugene, the Beavers lost for the first time at Autzen Stadium.

Andros stepped down and became the OSU athletic director in late November, and retired a decade later in 1985. Craig Fertig, a 33-year-old USC assistant and former Trojan quarterback, was hired as the Beavers' head coach in December, with a three-year contract at $26,000 per year.

Schedule

References

Oregon State
Oregon State Beavers football seasons
Oregon State Beavers football